Charles Manners may refer to:

 Charles Manners (bass) (1857–1935), British bass singer and opera company manager
 Lord Charles Manners (British Army major-general) (d. 1761), British general, son of the second Duke of Rutland
 Charles Manners, 4th Duke of Rutland (1754–1787), British politician and nobleman
 Lord Charles Manners (1780–1855), British general, son of the fourth Duke of Rutland
 Charles Manners, 6th Duke of Rutland (1815–1888), British politician and nobleman
 Charles Manners, 10th Duke of Rutland (1919–1999)

See also
Charles Manners-Sutton, archbishop of Canterbury
Charles Manners-Sutton, 1st Viscount Canterbury, Speaker of the House of Commons
Charles Manners Lushington, MP for Canterbury